A Closed Book may refer to:
 A Closed Book (novel)
 A Closed Book (film)